The House of Bjelbo, also known as the House of Folkung (Folkungaätten), was an Ostrogothian Swedish family that provided several medieval Swedish bishops, jarls and kings. It also provided three kings of Norway and one king of Denmark in the 14th century.

Name and origin 
The house has been known as the "House of Folkung" since the 17th century, and this name is still commonly used in Swedish works of reference. The name "folkung" does appear as early as in 12th century sources, but is then usually not applied to members of the family.

In an effort to avoid confusion with the Folkunge Party some modern historians have argued that "House of Bjälbo" would be a better name because Birger Jarl lived there and it is the family's oldest known manor. Bjälbo is located in Östergötland, outside of Skänninge in the present-day municipality of Mjölby. In any case the members of this dynasty never used a name to refer to themselves since family names were not widely adopted in Sweden until the 16th century, thus neither name is more "correct" for the dynasty, apart from the potential for confusion.

Jarls and bishops 
The House of Bjelbo produced most of the jarls in Sweden in the 11th, 12th and 13th centuries until the title was abolished in 1266. Different branches of the family were often rivals for the office of jarl. Most of the kings during that time were also from Östergötland.

Around 1100, Folke the Fat became the first known Bjelbo jarl, and probably the first jarl of all Sweden, under king Inge I of Sweden. He was married to a Ingegerd Knutsdotter of Denmark, daughter of king Canute IV of Denmark. According to legends, he was the first of his family so elevated. Nothing is known of any of Folke's collateral relatives, though it is well-established that several of his sons' descendants were important lords.

Other notable jarls from the family were Birger Brosa, Charles the Deaf, Ulf Fase, and Birger jarl. In the early 13th century, some members of the family moved to Norway, and held the office of jarl there. Noteworthy is that regardless of the ruling royal family, Bjelbos continued to hold the position of the jarl in the kingdom.

Several members of the family were also Bishops of Linköping at least in the 13th century. Diocese covered the area of Östergötland. Bishop of Linköping was often involved in the eastern activities.

Early Dukes of Finland were from the House of Bjelbo and used the traditional coat of arms with a rampant lion. This developed later to the current Coat of arms of Finland during the reign of Johan as Grand Duke of Finland, the lion from which serves as the symbol of the state and in stylized forms various authorities.

Rise to royalty 
Valdemar, a son of Birger jarl, was elected as the King of Sweden in 1250. Members of the House of Bjelbo Had married into all rival royal dynasties in Sweden eventually producing an heir related to them all. When the previous king Eric had died without an heir apparent, his sister's son, and also Birger's son, was the most suitable option to hold the royal office. Valdemar was deposed by his brother Magnus in 1275, from which all later royal members descended.

Members of the house reigned as kings Sweden until 1364. From 1319 to 1387, kings of Norway. The last Bjelbo-king was King of Denmark from 1376 to 1387; the last male member, descended from the deposed Valdemar, died a few years later. Almost all subsequent monarchs of Sweden, Norway and Denmark trace cognatic descent from the House of Bjelbo.

See also 
 List of Swedish monarchs
 List of Norwegian monarchs
 List of Danish monarchs
 Jarl in Sweden
 Bishop of Linköping

Sources
This article is fully or partially based on material from Nordisk familjebok (1908).

Other sources
Lindkvist, Thomas with Maria Sjöberg  (2006) Det svenska samhället 800-1720. Klerkernas och adelns tid, Andra upplagan (Lund: Studentlitteratur) 
Starbäck, Georg; P.O. Bäckström (1885–1886) Berättelser ur svenska historien (Stockholm: F. & G. Beijers Förlag)

Notes

References

External links

 
Bjelbo
14th century in Norway
Norwegian monarchy
13th century in Sweden
14th century in Sweden